Pettee is a surname. Notable people with the surname include:

 Annah G. Pettee, American politician
 Julia Pettee (1872–1967), American librarian
 Pat Pettee (1863–1934), American baseball player

See also
 Pettes